Dance with Me Into the Morning (German: Tanze mit mir in den Morgen) is a 1962 Austrian musical film directed by Peter Dörre and starring Gerhard Wendland, Guggi Löwinger and Rex Gildo.

The film's sets were designed by the art director Sepp Rothaur. It was shot at the Rosenhügel Studios in Vienna.

Main cast
 Gerhard Wendland as himself 
 Guggi Löwinger as Franziska Ebeseder 
 Rex Gildo as Stefan Breuer 
 Paul Hörbiger as Johann Ebeseder 
 Oskar Sima as Franz Biedermann 
 Marianne Schönauer as C. Werner 
 Hans Richter as Detektiv 
 Evi Kent as Daisy Biedermann 
 Udo Jürgens as Max Kainz 
 Rudolf Carl as Wenzel Kainz 
 Joseph Egger as Kapitän Zebel 
 Lotte Lang as Amalia Strassmeier 
 Erich Padalewski as Blumenhändler Georg Hager 
 Fred Berhoff as Architekt Thomas

References

Bibliography 
 Robert Von Dassanowsky. Austrian Cinema: A History. McFarland, 2005.

External links 
 

1962 films
Austrian musical films
1962 musical films
1960s German-language films
Films shot at Rosenhügel Studios